Aethiopsestis echinata is a moth in the family Drepanidae. It was described by Watson in 1965. It is found in Zimbabwe.

References

Endemic fauna of Zimbabwe
Moths described in 1965
Thyatirinae
Moths of Africa